The 2011–12 Segunda División season (known as the Liga Adelante for sponsorship reasons) was the 81st since its establishment. The first matches of the season were played on 26 August 2011 after the Association of Spanish Footballers (AFE) called a strike, the regular league ended on 3 June 2012, while the entire season ended on 16 June 2012 with the promotion play-off finals.

The first goal of the season was scored by Xabier Etxeita, who scored a ninth-minute goal for Elche against Girona in the early kick-off. The first red card of the season was given to Richy from Girona in their opening game against Elche. The first hat-trick was scored by Joselu in the match between Villarreal B and Gimnàstic de Tarragona.

Teams
Deportivo La Coruña, Hércules and Almería are the teams which were relegated from La Liga the previous season. Deportivo were relegated after 20 years in La Liga, Hércules made their immediate return to the second level after just one season in the top division, while Almería ended a four-year tenure in La Liga. Betis were promoted after two consecutive seasons in the second level, Rayo Vallecano after eight years in lower divisions and Granada after playing in lower divisions for 35 years.

The teams which were relegated the previous season were Salamanca, Tenerife, Ponferradina and Albacete. These four were replaced by Real Murcia (group 4 champions and 2ªB champions), Sabadell (group 3 champions and 2ªB runners-up), Alcoyano and Guadalajara.

Stadia and locations

Personnel and sponsorship

1. Barcelona B makes a donation to UNICEF in order to display the charity's logo on the club's kit.
2. Club's own brand.

Managerial changes

League table

Positions by round

Results

Promotion play-offs

This promotion phase (known as Promoción de ascenso) was to determine the third team which was promoted to 2012–13 La Liga. Teams placed between third and sixth position (excluding reserve teams) took part in the promotion play-offs. Fifth placed faced against the fourth, while the sixth positioned team faced against the third. The first leg of the semi-finals was played on 6 June with the best positioned team playing at home the second leg was played on 10 June. The final was also be two-legged, with the first leg on 13 June and the second leg on 16 June, with the best positioned team also playing at home the second leg. This season was introduced the rule in which if a tie was drawn on aggregate and was still drawn after extra time, round of penalties was not used, instead the best positioned team advanced to next round. Valladolid and Alcorcón played the final phase, where Valladolid was winner and promoted to La Liga after a two-year absence. Córdoba and Hércules were eliminated in semi-finals.

Play-Offs

Semifinals

First leg

Second leg

Final

Awards and season statistics

Top goalscorers
This is the list of goalscorers in accordance with LFP as organising body.

Source: Marca

Zamora Trophy
The Zamora Trophy is awarded to the goalkeeper with least goals to games ratio.

Source: Marca

Fair Play award
This award is given annually since 1999 to the team with the best fair play during the season. This ranking takes into account aspects such as cards, suspension of matches, audience behaviour and other penalties. This section not only aims to know this aspect, but also serves to break the tie in teams that are tied in all the other rules: points, head-to-head, goal difference and goals scored.

Source: 2011–12 Fair Play Rankings Season

Scoring
First goal of the season: Xabier Etxeita for Elche CF against Girona FC (26 August 2011)
Fastest goal in a match: 50 seconds – Leonardo Ulloa for UD Almería against Elche CF (23 September 2011)
Goal scored at the latest point in a match: 90+5 minutes
Grégory Béranger for Elche CF against Girona FC (26 August 2011)
Gerard for Villarreal CF B against Xerez CD (10 December 2011)
Widest winning margin: 6
Elche CF 6–0 AD Alcorcón (16 December 2011)
Xerez CD 0–6 FC Barcelona B (3 June 2012)
Most goals in a match: 8
Girona FC 5–3 Xerez CD (10 March 2012)
Real Murcia 2–6 Hércules CF (14 April 2012)
FC Cartagena 6–2 Villarreal CF B (27 May 2012)
First hat-trick of the season: Joselu for Villarreal CF B against Gimnàstic de Tarragona (30 September 2011)
Most goals by one player in a single match: 3
Joselu for Villarreal CF B against Gimnàstic de Tarragona (30 September 2011)
Ángel for Elche CF against AD Alcorcón (16 December 2011)
Javi Guerra for Real Valladolid against CE Sabadell FC (7 January 2012)
Leonardo Ulloa for UD Almería against Guadalajara (14 January 2012)
Óscar for Real Valladolid against Gimnàstic de Tarragona (5 February 2012)
Julio Álvarez for CD Numancia against Elche CF (17 March 2012)
Jesús Berrocal for Recreativo de Huelva against CD Guadalajara (7 April 2012)
Coro for Girona FC against CD Guadalajara (5 May 2012)
Dani Nieto for Girona FC against CD Alcoyano (12 May 2012)
Quini for AD Alcorcón against Elche CF (16 May 2012)
Most goals by one team in a match: 6
Elche CF 6–0 AD Alcorcón (16 December 2011)
Real Murcia 2–6 Hércules CF (14 April 2012)
FC Cartagena 6–2 Villarreal CF B (27 May 2012)
Xerez CD 0–6 FC Barcelona B (3 June 2012)
First own goal of the season: Ruymán Hernández for CD Guadalajara against UD Las Palmas (27 August 2011)
Most goals in one half by one team: 4
Elche CF 6–0 AD Alcorcón (16 December 2011)
CD Numancia 5–0 Córdoba CF (18 February 2012)
Hércules CF 4–2 Girona FC (6 April 2012)
Real Murcia 2–6 Hércules CF (14 April 2012)
Celta de Vigo 4–1 FC Barcelona B (28 April 2012)
Villarreal CF B 1–4 UD Las Palmas (5 May 2012)
CD Alcoyano 0–5 Hércules CF (23 May 2012)
Xerez CD 0–6 FC Barcelona B (3 June 2012)
Most goals scored by losing team: 3
Villarreal CF B 3–4 CE Sabadell FC (3 September 2011)
Girona FC 5–3 Xerez CD (10 March 2012)
Deportivo de La Coruña 4–3 Elche CF (22 April 2012)

Discipline
First yellow card: Sergio Mantecón for Elche CF against Girona FC (26 August 2011)
First red card: Richy for Girona FC against Elche CF (26 August 2011)

Teams by autonomous community

See also
 List of Spanish football transfers summer 2011
 List of Spanish football transfers winter 2011–12
 2011–12 La Liga
 2012 Segunda División play-offs
 2011–12 Segunda División B
 2011–12 Copa del Rey

References

 
2011-12

2
Spa